Danny Malloy is the name of:

 Danny Malloy (footballer) (1930–2015), Scottish former footballer and manager
 Danny Malloy (boxer) (born 1929), former boxer and footballer

See also
Daniel Molloy, fictional character
Dannel Malloy (born 1955), Former Governor of Connecticut